Ella St. Clair Thompson (1870–1944) was an American suffragist.

Life
Thompson née Clapp was born on January 10, 1870, in Bakersville, North Carolina. In 1908 she married Edwin St. Clair Thompson. The couple settled in Washington, D.C.

Thompson was an active suffragist. She was a member of the Congressional Union for Woman Suffrage (CUWS), where she served as the North Carolina Field Secretary. In 1915 she traveled to the western states of Arizona, Colorado, New Mexico, and Texas. In New Mexico, Thompson worked with Adelina Otero-Warren to recruit members for a new chapter of the CUWS. The women made a particular effort to recruit Hispanic women to the cause, printing leaflets in Spanish as well as English. In 1916 she traveled to Missouri campaigning for Republican Charles Evans Hughes' failed presidential candidacy. Hughes supported suffrage on a federal level, as an amendment to the U.S. Constitution. In 1917 Thompson traveled with Alice Paul to work on setting up a new branch of the National Woman's Party (NWP).

Thompson was a member of the National Woman's Party, serving as the North Carolina Chair. 

In 1918 the Thompsons moved to New York City. The following year, 1919, Ella was arrested outside of the Metropolitan Opera House, demonstrating against Woodrow Wilson.

Edwin died in 1933. Ella died in Asheville, North Carolina, on December 17, 1944.

See also
 List of suffragists and suffragettes

References

1870 births 
1944 deaths
clubwomen 
American suffragists
National Woman's Party activists